The Vydra (Czech for "otter") is a  river in the Czech Republic.

The Vydra begins in the Bohemian Forest near Modrava, at the confluence of the Roklanský potok and the Modravský potok. However, Modravský potok's tributary, the Luzenský potok originates slightly across the Germany–Czech Republic border  up the north slopes of Mt. Lusen ) in Bavaria is considered to be the Vydra's true source.

From Modrava, the Vydra flows northward and merges with the Křemelná west of Svojše to form the Otava.

External links

Vydra Hydroelectric Power Station
http://www.jiznicechy.org/en/index.php?path=prir/vydra.htm

Rivers of the Plzeň Region
Bohemian Forest